is the second studio album by An Cafe, released on November 29, 2006, in Japan and on May 21, 2007, in South Korea. A limited edition was released as well, containing an additional DVD with several music videos. The album, which was also Bou's last appearance in An Cafe, peaked at No. 33 on the Japanese albums chart.

Track listing

Personnel
 Miku – vocals
 Bou – guitar
 Kanon – bass guitar
 Teruki – drums

References

An Cafe albums
2006 albums